Ljungby Arena, previously named Sunnerbohov, is an indoor arena located in Ljungby, Sweden. It is IF Troja/Ljungby's home arena and has a capacity of 3,620 spectators. The current spectator record was set on 21 January 1997, when 4,050 spectators visited to see IF Troja/Ljungby meet Brynäs IF.

References 

Indoor ice hockey venues in Sweden
Buildings and structures in Kronoberg County